The Night of Winter (Kurdish: Şeva Zistanê, شه‌وی زمستان) is an unofficial holiday celebrated by communities throughout the Kurdistan region in the Middle East. The night is considered one of the oldest holidays still observed by modern Kurds and was celebrated by ancient tribes in the region as a holy day. The holiday falls every year on the Winter Solstice. Since the night is the longest in the year, ancient tribes in the Kurdistan region believed that it was the night before a victory of light over darkness and signified a rebirth of the Sun. The Sun plays an important role in several old religions still practiced by some Kurds, including Yezidism

Several small religious communities in Kurdistan share similar ideas in regard to Şeva Zistanê.  The belief of light over darkness is well documented by scholars of the various religions. The Winter Solstice is assumed to be the night when the evil spirit is at the peak of his strength. The following day is celebratory as it is believed that God and his angels have claimed victory. Since the days are getting longer and the nights shorter, this day marks the victory of light, or the Sun, over the darkness or evil.

In modern times, communities in the Kurdistan region still observe the night as a holiday. Many families prepare large feasts for their communities and the children play games and are given sweets in similar fashion to modern-day Halloween practices.

References

Winter festivals